The Marketing Agencies Association Group (MAAG), formerly known as the Marketing Communication Consultant Association (MCCA), is the trade association of marketing communications agencies in the United Kingdom.  It was established to protect, defend and support marketing communication agencies.

Membership of MAAG encompasses digital, experiential, direct marketing and integrated agencies.

Mission 

Energise communication agencies for a changing future, by sharing knowledge, sharing vision and sharing possibilities. MAAG is agency only in membership and non-discipline specific.

MAAG services

Agency management support

Legal and copy advice
Pitch protection
Access to all MAAG guides, surveys and tool kits
Access to the procurement eDesk
Preferred suppliers
Management consultancy

Agency development support

Preferential MAAG training rates
Preferential rates for entry to The Best Awards
Online advertising of agency vacancies to the industry via the web site
Graduate recruitment programme run by the MAAG

New Business Support

Agency Finder
Feature in the online directory and Agency Finder search
Inclusion in The Agency Little Black Book
Inclusion in The Handy Case Studies Book
New Business Services
New Business Group

Networking Support

Members Dinners
Access to MAAG Groups and message boards

References

Website 
 Official site

Trade associations based in the United Kingdom
Marketing organizations